Denbigh Friary (also known as Henllan Friary) is a ruined monastic religious house located in Clwyd, Wales. Founded in 1343-50 (or before 1289), the friary was dedicated to St Mary, and was a Carmelite community. The English Benedictine abbot, Robert Parfew was involved in the 18 August 1538 surrender of the Carmelites of Denbigh Friary. During the Dissolution, some of the buildings were turned into houses, while wool was sold in the church. The 14th century building has been in ruins since an 1898 fire. The ruins are mostly from the 13th and 15th centuries, and include parts of a choir, a gable end, and nave walls.

References

External links 

Ruins in Wales
Medieval Wales
Christian monasteries established in the 14th century
Grade II* listed buildings in Denbighshire
Scheduled monuments in Denbighshire